Kamal Bafounta Ortega (born 8 January 2002) is a French footballer who plays as a midfielder for Lorient B.

International career
Bafounta was born in France to a Congolese father and Spanish mother. He has represented France at under-16 level.

Career statistics

Club

Notes

References

2002 births
Living people
People from Vénissieux
French people of Spanish descent
Sportspeople from Lyon Metropolis
French sportspeople of Republic of the Congo descent
French footballers
Footballers from Auvergne-Rhône-Alpes
Association football midfielders
France youth international footballers
3. Liga players
Championnat National 2 players
ASM Vénissieux players
AS Saint-Priest players
Olympique Lyonnais players
FC Nantes players
Borussia Dortmund II players
FC Lorient players
French expatriate footballers
French expatriate sportspeople in Germany
Expatriate footballers in Germany
Black French sportspeople